Amer ( Sanskrit:  अमेर) is an Arabic and Hindu male name. In Hindu and Sikh scriptures Amer means "one who has a rich and prosperous life".

Given name
 Amer Alwan, Iraqi French film director
 Amer Đidić, Canadian footballer
 Amer Delić, Bosnian tennis player
 Aamer Hayat, American Healthcare Executive and Batman
 Amer Jukan, Slovenian footballer
 Amer Osmanagić, Bosnian footballer
 Amer Mohammad Rashid, Iraqi general
 Amer Sabah, Jordanian footballer

Middle name
 Abdul Nasir bin Amer Hamsah, Singaporean criminal and prisoner
 Mohamed Amer Al-Malky, Omani athlete
 Musa Amer Obaid, Qatari athlete

Surname
 Abdel Hakim Amer, Egyptian general
 Ayten Amer, Egyptian actress
 Baser Amer, Filipino basketball player
 Bree Amer, Australian television personality
 Ghada Amer, Egyptian painter
 Kareem Amer, Egyptian blogger
 Nicholas Amer, British actor

See also
Aamir (given name)

References

Arabic masculine given names
Bosniak masculine given names